Map of places in West Dunbartonshire compiled from this list
See the list of places in Scotland for places in other counties.

This List of places in West Dunbartonshire is a list of links for any town, village, hamlet, castle, golf course, historic house, island, lake, nature reserve, reservoir, river, and other place of interest in the West Dunbartonshire council area of Scotland.

 

A
Alexandria, Alexandria railway station 
Antonine Wall
 Argyll Motor Works

B
Balloch, Balloch Castle, Balloch Country Park, Balloch railway station 
 Bellsmyre 
Bonhill
Bowling, Bowling railway station 
Brucehill

C
 Castlehill
Clydebank, Clydebank High School, Clydebank Museum, Clydebank railway station, Clydebank Town Hall 
Crosslet

D
 Dalmonach 
 Dalmuir, Dalmuir railway station 
 Dalreoch railway station 
Dennystown
 Drumry, Drumry railway station 
Dumbarton, Dumbarton Academy, Dumbarton Castle, Dumbarton Football Stadium, Dumbarton Rock
Dumbuck Ford
Duntocher

E
Erskine Bridge

F
 Faifley 
Forth and Clyde Canal

G
 Glenhead Park 
 Golden Jubilee University National Hospital

H
Hardgate
 Holm Park

I
Inchmurrin

J
Jamestown

K
 Kilbowie 
Kilpatrick Hills
 Kilpatrick railway station 
Kirktonhill

L
 Linnvale 
Loch Lomond, Loch Lomond and The Trossachs National Park, Loch Lomond Distillery, Loch Lomond Golf Club

M
 Mill of Haldane 
Milton
Milton Island
 Millburn Park 
 Mountblow

O
Old Kilpatrick
 Our Lady and St Patrick's High School 
Overtoun, Overtoun House

P
 Parkhall

R
 Radnor Park 
Renton, Renton railway station 
River Clyde
River Leven
 Rosshead

S
 Silverton 
Singer railway station
 St Peter the Apostle High School

T
 Titan Clydebank

V
Vale of Leven, Vale of Leven Academy, Vale of Leven Hospital

W
 Westcliff
 West College Scotland 
 Whitecrook

Y
 Yoker railway station

See also
 List of listed buildings in West Dunbartonshire 
List of places in Scotland
 Wards of West Dunbartonshire 

West Dunbartonshire
Geography of West Dunbartonshire
Lists of places in Scotland
Populated places in Scotland